James Haydock (6 December 1872 – 24 March 1900) was an English footballer who played in the Football League for Blackburn Rovers.

References

1872 births
1900 deaths
English footballers
Association football forwards
English Football League players
Blackburn Rovers F.C. players